John Joseph Kindred (July 15, 1864 – October 23, 1937) was an American physician and politician.  Kindred served five terms as U.S. Representative from New York from 1911 to 1913, and from 1921 to 1929, before returning to the practice of medicine. As a physician, his focus was on mental diseases, and he established mental hospitals in New York, New Jersey and Connecticut.

Medical career
Born near Courtland, Virginia, Kindred attended the local schools, Randolph-Macon College, Ashland, Virginia, and the University of Virginia.

He taught school in Virginia in 1886 and 1887. His boyhood home at Courtland is known as Mahone's Tavern.
He graduated from the Hospital College of Medicine, Louisville, Kentucky, in 1889 and commenced the practice of his profession in New York City the same year.
He graduated in mental diseases from the University of Edinburgh, Scotland, in 1892.
He established several mental hospitals in Connecticut, New York, and New Jersey.

Legal career

He graduated in law in 1919 and was admitted to the bar in 1926.

Political career

Kindred was elected as a Democrat to the Sixty-second Congress (March 4, 1911 – March 3, 1913).
He was not a candidate for renomination in 1912.
He became interested in agricultural pursuits and in the construction of houses.

Kindred was elected to the Sixty-seventh and to the three succeeding Congresses (March 4, 1921 – March 3, 1929). He was not a candidate for renomination in 1928.

Educational career

He resumed his medical profession in Manhattan, New York City 1930-1937 and also served as professor of medical jurisprudence at John B. Stetson University, DeLand, Florida, 1933 to 1937.

Death

He died on October 23, 1937 at Astoria, New York and was interred in Poughkeepsie Rural Cemetery.

References

1864 births
1937 deaths
19th-century American educators
20th-century American educators
19th-century American physicians
20th-century American physicians
20th-century American politicians
American psychiatrists
Randolph–Macon College alumni
University of Virginia alumni
Burials at Poughkeepsie Rural Cemetery
People from Courtland, Virginia
Stetson University faculty
Democratic Party members of the United States House of Representatives from New York (state)
Alumni of the University of Edinburgh